Saint-Manvieu War Cemetery is a British Second World War cemetery of Commonwealth soldiers in France, located 10 km west of Caen, Normandy. The cemetery's designation often uses the nearby commune of Cheux but the graveyard is actually closer to the commune of Saint-Manvieu-Norrey. The graveyard contains  1,627 Commonwealth war graves and 555 German war graves. The cemetery is maintained by the Commonwealth War Graves Commission.

History
A large proportion of the soldiers buried here are from the battles that took place between Tilly-sur-Seulles and Caen from mid-June to late-July 1944. Key engagements at this time were Operations Epsom and Jupiter. The cemetery received its first interments in mid-June 1944.

Location
The cemetery is 10 km west of Caen, on the D.9 (Rue de la Guinguette).

See also
 American Battle Monuments Commission
 UK National Inventory of War Memorials
 German War Graves Commission
 List of military cemeteries in Normandy

References

Further reading
 Shilleto, Carl, and Tolhurst, Mike (2008). “A Traveler’s Guide to D-Day and the Battle of Normandy”. Northampton, Mass.: Interlink.

External links
 

World War II memorials in France
World War II cemeteries in France
British military memorials and cemeteries
Commonwealth War Graves Commission cemeteries in France
Canadian military memorials and cemeteries
1944 establishments in France
Cemeteries in Calvados (department)